The Church of All Saints, usually known as All Saints' Church, is an Anglican church in Ockham, England. It is the parish church of Ockham with Hatchford and Downside. Due to its architectural significance, the church is a Grade I* listed building.

History
Ockham parish appears in the Domesday Book of 1086 as Bocheham. Held by Richard Fitz Gilbert, its domesday assets were: 1½ hides, 1 church, 2 fisheries worth 10d, 3 ploughs,  of meadow, woodland worth 60 hogs. It rendered £10 per year to its overlords.

The foundations of All Saints' Church were laid in the 12th century, and part of the nave was built then. The chancel and north aisle date from the 13th century, the south nave wall from the 14th century, and the tower and north aisle wall from the 15th century.  A small chapel (north wing) was finished in 1735. The whole building was restored and enlarged in 1874-75 by Thomas Graham Jackson.

The church includes a memorial to those who gave their lives in the Great War and World War II.

References

External links
All Saints' Church

Church of England church buildings in Surrey
Grade I listed churches in Surrey